Off Pedder (Traditional Chinese: 畢打自己人) is a TVB modern drama series broadcast since October 2008 and ended on 12 February 2010.

The sitcom is about office politics in a magazine company, as well as family and romantic relationships amongst the characters, with the majority of the cast from Best Selling Secrets.

Synopsis

Chiu (潮) Magazine is part of the Kam Bo Corporation, and has its offices on Pedder Street in Hong Kong (thus giving rise to the name of the series).  The show centres on the politics of the Chiu (潮) and Kam Bo office, and the lives of the characters who work in this office.

Central to the plot are Yan Seung (Teresa Mo), who takes up a position early on in the series as editor of Chiu (潮).  The initial plot focused on her rivalry with the Head of Sales, Susan Ka So-Shan (Elaine Jin). As more characters were introduced, the plot expanded to focus on Yim Yue Tai (Stephen Au) and  Yu Ka Sing (Wayne Lai). How will these four individuals affect Pedder Street and who will become the ultimate leader of Chiu (潮) Magazine...?

Episode Guide

Cast

Chiu(潮) Magazine

Editorial Department

Sales and Marketing Department

Design Department

Yip (葉氏) Family

Happy Bar

Other cast

Production notes
 On November 24, 2009, actor Chan Hung Lit had a heart attack after filming an episode. He was transported to the Tseung Kwan O Hospital where he died at 7:11 p.m. at the age of 66
 On November 24, 2009 before airing episode 279, there was a ten-second black and white tribute clip for Chan with the captions, "親愛的鴻烈大哥　謝謝您的一切　我們永遠懷念您" ("Dearest Brother Hung Lit. Thank you for everything. We will always miss you.").
 On November 26, 2009, TVB held a meeting and decided Chan's character "Yim Hei" would die of a heart attack like Chan did in real life.
 On December 8, 2009, production was halted for the cast to attend Chan Hung Lit's funeral.
 On January 6, 2010, the tribute episode 310 for Chan entitled "我們的大閆生" ("Our Mr. Yim") was aired.
 On January 7, 2010, Chan Hung Lit was removed from the title sequence.

Award nominations
TVB Anniversary Awards (2009)
Won:
 Most Improved Actress (Aimee Chan)
Nominated:
 Best Drama
 Best Actress (Teresa Mo) Top 5
 Best Supporting Actor (Stephen Au) Top 15
 Best Supporting Actor (Tsui Wing) Top 15
 My Favourite Female Character (Teresa Mo) Top 5
 Most Improved Actor (Raymond Chiu) Top 5
 Most Improved Actor (Jim Tang) Top 5
 Most Improved Actress (Queenie Chu) Top 5

14th Asian Television Awards (2009)
Nominated
BEST COMEDY PROGRAMME

Minpao Weekly Awards 2010
Nominated
 Most Outstanding Actor: Wayne Lai for Yu Ka Sing

Viewership ratings

References

External links
TVB.com Off Pedder – Official Website 
Wong Cho Lam's Blog @ TVB.com Off Pedder – Information and Costume Fitting Ceremony Pictures 
BATGWA.com Off Pedder – News on Costume Fitting Ceremony 

TVB dramas
2008 Hong Kong television series debuts
2010 Hong Kong television series endings